Adrian Mihai Popescu (born 26 July 1960) is a Romanian retired football defender.

Career
He was born in Craiova and debuted in Divizia A with Universitatea Craiova in 1981. He gradually became their first-choice libero, and helped win the league championship in 1991 as well as the Romanian Cup with the same club in 1983 and 1991. He also played abroad, in the Swiss second division and for Maltese side Birkirkara.

Popescu made his debut for the Romania national team in 1990 against Egypt, and was chosen for the 1990 FIFA World Cup squad. He only got 7 caps in total, the last in 1992, and scored one international goal, against Bulgaria in 1991.

Honours

Club
Universitatea Craiova
Romanian Championship League: 1980–81, 1990–91
Cupa României: 1980–81, 1982–83, 1990–91

References

External links

 
 

1960 births
Living people
Sportspeople from Craiova
Romanian footballers
Romania international footballers
1990 FIFA World Cup players
Liga I players
Liga II players
CS Universitatea Craiova players
FC U Craiova 1948 players
FC Politehnica Iași (1945) players
FC Locarno players
Birkirkara F.C. players
Association football defenders